This article displays the squads of the teams that competed in 2016 FIBA World Olympic Qualifying Tournaments for Men. Each team consists of 12 players.

Age and club as of the start of the tournament, 4 July 2016.

OQT Belgrade (Serbia)

Serbia

Angola 
Preliminary squad.

Puerto Rico

Japan 

}

Czech Republic 

}

Latvia

OQT Manila (Philippines)

Turkey

Senegal

Canada

France

New Zealand

Philippines

OQT Turin (Italy)

Greece

Mexico

Iran

Tunisia

Croatia

Italy

References

squads
Qual